Maud Mary Brindley (1866–1939) was an English artist and suffragette and a member of the Women's Social and Political Union.

Early life
Brindley was born in Carlisle in 1866 the daughter of Major Eadon.

Activist
She was arrested for "incitement to rush the House of Commons" following a rally at Trafalgar Square in October 1908 which led to a three-month term in Holloway. She was remanded for

In 1913 Brindley was arrested and sentenced for breaking shop windows in Oxford Street; she served a five-month sentence at Holloway.

Family life
Brindley married fellow artist and landscape painter John Angell James Brindley in 1899. She died on 28 November 1939 at West Malling, in Kent.

References

1866 births
1939 deaths
English suffragists
English suffragettes
British women's rights activists
Women's Social and Political Union